The  is a bus company within the Tobu Group which was established on 11 January 1941 in Tsuchiura.

Overview
ASAHI Motor was established on 11 January 1941 in Tsuchiura as a company for taxis and buses. The taxi business of Tobu Railway on stations which belonged to Tobu Railway transferred to this company in 1954.

The company received ownership of offices and vehicles of the Tobu Railway bus department in 1994. Between 1999 and 2002, the bus company transferred a selection of offices and other vehicles from Tobu Bus. The transfer of assets ended in 2002 when Tobu Bus spilt from Tobu Railway. ASAHI Motor discontinued its chartered bus business in 2008, at which point the business was spilt into subsidiary companies.

The company owns shares of Bando Bus and other companies. Its parent company, Asahi Motor Corporation Group, owns TOHOKU KYUKO BUS, Kan-etsu Kotsu, Nikko-koutsu, Kokusai Juo Bus, KAWAGOE Motor, Bando BUS, and IBAKYU Motor.

Offices and routes
Management and overall of affiliated and group companies head office
It is located near the head office of Tobu Railway in Oshiage Station.
Head office
It is located near Ōbukuro Station on Tobu Skytree Line
Koshigaya Office (Route buses and Chartered buses)
Kita-Koshigaya Office (Taxies)
Sugito Office (Route buses and Chartered buses, Taxies)
Kazo Office (Route buses and Chartered buses, Taxies)
Kuki Office (Route buses and Chartered buses, Taxies)
Honjo Office (Route buses and Chartered buses, Taxies)
Sakai Office (Route buses and Taxies)
Ota Office (Route buses and Taxies)
Shobu Office (Route buses and Chartered buses)
Noda Office (Taxies)

Kiryu Asahi Motor Corporation
Kiryu Office (The head office of Kiryu Asahi Motor Corporation)
Omama Office

Community buses
Entrust this company from each local government.

Tokyo
Adachi City Community Bus Harukaze
Saitama
Kasukabe City Community Bus Haru Bus
Kazo City Community Bus Kazo Kizuna
Gyoda City Community Bus Gyoda City Circular-route Bus
Kounosu City Community Bus Flower
Hanyu City Community Ai・Ai Bus
Soka City Community Bus PariPorikun Bus
Sugito City Community Bus Aiai
Ageo City Community Bus Guruttokun
Chiba
Noda City Community Bus Mame Bus
Ibaraki
Goka City Community Bus Gokarin

Other bus routes
TOHOKU KYUKO BUS
Kan-etsu Kotsu
Nikko-koutsu
Kokusai Juo Bus
KAWAGOE Motor
Bando BUS
IBAKYU Motor

Other bus companies of TOBU GROUP
Tobu Bus Nikko
Tobu Bus West
Tobu Bus Central

Tohoku Kyuko Bus

The  is a subsidiary company of Tobu Railway and belongs to Asahi Motor Corporation Group. The head office is located in Tokyo Office.

Overview
In 1962, the company was established by capital injection of Tobu Railway and Toya Kotsu, Miyagi Transportation and Fukushima Transportation, Aizu Bus, Yamagata Kotsu. In 2002, Tohoku Kyuko Bus started to be an affiliated company of Tobu Railway because Tobu Railway received other shares.

History
In 1962
12 June: Establishment by capital injection of Tobu Railway and Toya Kotsu, Miyagi Transportation and Fukushima Transportation, Aizu Bus, Yamagata Kotsu
1 August: The company started to operate the bus routes
In 1964
Started to manage chartered buses at the Tokyo Office
In 2002
This company has belonged to Tobu Railway

Office
Tokyo Office (Shinonome Garage)
It is located head office of this company. Opened in 1962.
Sendai Office
It is located near Sendai Station at 1-1-7, Motomachi, Aoba, Sendai, Miyagi
Sendai Garage
It is located at 2, Azuma, Aoba, Sendai, Miyagi

Highway buses

Kan-etsu Kotsu

The  is a subsidiary company of Tobu Railway and belongs to Asahi Motor Corporation Group. The head office is located in Shibukawa.

Overview
It was renamed to its current name on 1 November 1972. It has been operating bus routes since 1982.

Agatsuma Kanko Motor, established on 5 November 1953, and had belonged to Tobu Group from 1969 until October 2002 when it was merged into Kan-etsu Kotsu.

Gunma Kanko Taxi established in 1950, belonged to Tobu Bus Group from 1957 until 2000 when it was merged.

The bus company runs in the area based in the stations which belong to Jōetsu Line and Jōetsu Shinkansen.

Office
Head office
Shibukawa Office
Agatsuma Office
Maebashi Office
Numata Office
Kamata Office
Oze-Tokura Information desk
Tsukiyono Auto Gas Stand

Highway buses

Ticket
About one diary tickets for sightseeing in Gunma

Nikko Kotsu

The  is a subsidiary company of Tobu Railway. The head office is located in Nikko Office.

Overview
The company established on 25 May 1955, was transferred Akechidaira Ropeway from Tobu Railway on 1 April 1985. Tobu Dial Bus was merged to this company in 2008. The bus company runs in the vicinity of the Watarase Keikoku Line and the Tobu Kinugawa Line.

Office 
Nikko Office
Dial Office

Express buses

Subsidiary company
Akechidaira Ropeway

Tickets
About tickets for Nikko

Kokusai Juo Bus

 is a subsidiary company of ASAHI Motor and Bando Bus and Tobu Railway. The head office is located in Nikko Office.

Overview
The company was established on 26 December 1957 as Kokusai Hire which was a subsidiary company of Kokusai Kogyo. Kokusai Hire was merged into Ryomo Kanko Motor in 2002, which subsequently merged Juo Motor on 1 January 2004. The new company was renamed to Kokusai Juo.

Its operations are in the vicinity of the Tobu Isesaki Line and the Takasaki Line.

Office
Kumagaya Office
Isesaki Office

Bus routes

Route buses
Most bus routes are connected Higashi-Matsuyama Station and Shinrinkōen Station (Saitama) with Kumagaya Station as the result of the discontinuation of the Tobu Kumagaya Line.

Expressway buses

KAWAGOE Motor

The  is a subsidiary company of Tobu Railway. The head office is located in Shinrinkoen Office.

Outline
The company was established on 3 August 1933 as Kawagoe Motor LLC, and has belonged to Tobu Group since 1962. Meanwhile, KAWAGOE Motor Corporation was established on 4 August 1966. Kawagoe Motor LLC merged into KAWAGOE Motor Corporation on 1 November 1966.

Operations on bus routes started on 1 April 1998. Buses serve in the vicinity of the Tōbu Tōjō Line, Tobu Ogose Line, and the Takasaki Line.

Office
Shinrinkoen Office

Expressway buses

Bando Bus

 is a subsidiary company of ASAHI Motor. The head office is located in Abiko Office.

Overview
The company was established in November 1949 by local people because routes buses ran in Imba area had belonged to Tobu Railway since February 1958 until 2003.

The company has belonged to ASAHI Motor since 2003. It runs in the vicinity of the Jōban Line.

Office
Abiko Office
Higahsi-Abiko Garage
Shibazaki Garage

Community buses
ABI BUS

IBAKYU Motor

The  is a subsidiary company of Tobu Railway. The head office is located in Matsubushi Office.

Overview
The company was established as in 1950 as Uchiyama Un'yua and has been owned by the Tobu Group Company since 1963. That same year, it was renamed IBAKYU Motor.

It runs in the vicinity of the Tōbu Urban Park Line, Tobu Skytree Line, and the Utsunomiya Line.

Office
Matsubushi Office
Noda Office
koga Office
Iwai Garage
Kita-Moro Garage
Noda-Umesato Jutaku Turnroad

See also
Other bus companies of Tobu Group
Tobu Bus Group
Former companies belonging to Tobu Group
Aizu Bus
Toya Kotsu

Tobu Railway

References

External links 
 Official Website (in Japanese)

Tobu Railway
Bus companies of Japan
Transport in Saitama Prefecture
Transport in Chiba Prefecture
Transport in Gunma Prefecture
Transport in Tochigi Prefecture
Transport in Tokyo